Dominique Louis Seedeeal, mostly known as Darren L'activiste is a Mauritian social activist.

Protest against household gas and fuel
On the 22nd of April 2022, Dominique held a protest in regards to rising prices of household gas and fuel in the country. He was soon arrested by the local police for illegal protest. Hours after being arrested many other people came in his support by coming onto the streets infront of the Les Casernes Central, Port Louis demanding his release. Soon riots in different parts of the country were seen; the local police, Special Support Unit (SSU) and the Special Mobile Force (SMF) were deployed around the island to cater for the security of the Mauritian population.

Dominique released on parole
Dominique was later released the next day on parole, on Saturday the 24th of April 2022. He maintained that he will continue to fight for the Mauritian population and that everyone who came in support for him on the streets should remain calm and go home and wait for the government to come to a final decision on whether to reduce the prices of gas and fuel.

References

External links 
 

Mauritian activists
Living people
Year of birth missing (living people)